The thirty-third government of Israel, also known as the third Netanyahu government, was formed after the 22 January 2013 Knesset elections, took office on 18 March 2013, and served until 14 May 2015. The Prime Minister was Benjamin Netanyahu of Likud; the government was a coalition of Likud, Yisrael Beiteinu, Yesh Atid, The Jewish Home, and Hatnuah.

Formation
Likud and Yisrael Beiteinu, which had run a common list in the election, were the largest party in the Knesset, with 31 seats, and formed the government. Hatnuah agreed to become part of the government in February. The final coalition agreement between Likud-Beteinu and the other parties was as signed on 15 March. The coalition parties held 68 of the 120 seats in the Knesset. The parties agreed to a deal that would raise the voting threshold in future elections from 2 to 4 percent; had this restriction been effect in the 2013 elections, Kadima and the three Arab parties would have failed to qualify for seats in the Knesset. Some have suggested the change was implemented as an attempt to limit Arab representation, but that it could ultimately force the Arab parties to merge and this would bring greater unity in the long run.

Recommendations

Dissolution
On 2 December 2014, Netanyahu dismissed Minister of Justice Tzipi Livni (Hatnuah) and Minister of Finance Yair Lapid (Yesh Atid). Four other Yesh Atid ministers then resigned. This dissolved the government ahead of schedule, resulting in elections on 17 March 2015.

Cabinet members
There were 29 ministerial posts to fill, but Yesh Atid leader Yair Lapid called for a smaller cabinet. In response, the coalition agreed the cabinet was to have 20 members, with several members holding multiple ministries, plus eight deputy ministers. However, the cabinet that was sworn in had 22 ministers and eight deputy ministers. This did not include Foreign Minister Avigdor Lieberman, who had resigned in December 2012 after being charged with fraud. PM Netanyahu served as Foreign Minister until November 2013, when Lieberman was acquitted and returned to office.

Cabinet members

Deputy Ministers

Issues

In 2014, Housing Minister Ariel (Jewish Home) called for the construction of more houses in the West Bank area in response to the Fatah-Hamas national unity government deal. Finance Minister Lapid (Yesh Atid) threatened to bring down the government if any West Bank settlements were unilaterally annexed to Israel. Justice Minister Livni (Hatnuah) also threatened to leave the government. Religious Affairs Minister Bennett (Jewish Home) said that the proposal to annex settled parts of the West Bank was "the only sane plan." He added: "It’s no secret that for dozens of years there has been a chasmic [sic] disagreement on how to leave the settlements. It hasn’t proven itself." Government spokesman Mark Regev declined to comment on the proposal and its opposition.

References

External links
Government 33 Knesset website

 33
2013 establishments in Israel
2015 disestablishments in Israel
Cabinets established in 2013
Cabinets disestablished in 2015
2013 in Israeli politics
2014 in Israeli politics
2015 in Israeli politics
 33
+33